PPK is a Russian trance duo based primarily in Rostov-on-Don. The name 'PPK' is the abbreviation of founding members' initials; K was for short-time member DJ Kordj (Roman Korzhov).

Career
PPK became known internationally due to their single "ResuRection", which was available to download for free on mp3.com. A few million people downloaded it and such a wave of popularity brought to signing a contract with Paul Oakenfold's Perfecto label and was used to celebrate the New Year 2003 in Warsaw, Poland (seen on Sky News Active, 31 December 2002).

This song was the first from a Russian act or USSR act to ever enter the UK Singles Chart. The song reached number 3 in the UK and Sergei Pimenov, Alexander Polyakov and band's manager Yury Marychev were awarded with Silver Disc award certificated by British Phonographic Industry (BPI) and indicated sales of over 200,000 copies in the UK alone.

"ResuRection" was based on the original melody written by Eduard Artemyev from the 1979 Russian (Soviet) movie Siberiade and contained, in some remix versions, vocal samples of cosmonaut Yuri Gagarin. The Artemyev melody was later played in the opening ceremony for the 2014 Winter Olympics in Sochi, Russia, with a small girl holding a red balloon.

"Reload" was based on the melody "Zodiak" from the album Disco Alliance by Latvian electronic rock band Zodiaks. In early 2004 the duo released a remix of Minimalistix's 2003 hit Magic Fly.

The group finally broke up in 2011 after reuniting for a small concert tour in Russia in 2010.

On 23 February 2016, former member Roman Korzhov died from cancer.

On 5 May 2022, PPK announced the release of "Inspiration" on their official VK page.

Discography

Studio albums
 Чувствуйте неспать! (1998)
 Reload (2002)
 Russian Trance: Formation (2002)

Singles

References

External links
 
 
 mp3.com.au
 PPK at Russmus.Net
  pimenov.ru
  iRecords — Alexander Polyakov's label

Trance music groups
Russian electronic music groups
Club DJs
Russian dance musicians
Russian musical duos
Russian techno musicians